Automobile companies founded by and associated with the Ceirano brothers,  Giovanni Battista Ceirano, Giovanni Ceirano, Matteo Ceirano and Ernesto Ceirano and their descendants.

See also

 List of Italian companies

References

External links 
SCAT automobiles

Ceirano family
Defunct motor vehicle manufacturers of Italy
Turin motor companies
Brass Era vehicles
Fiat
1900s cars